Edward Champlin is a Professor of Classics, Cotsen Professor of Humanities, and former Master of Butler College at Princeton University. He teaches Roman history, Roman law, and Latin literature and has written several books regarding these subjects. He is also the co-editor of The Cambridge Ancient History, 2nd edition, volume 10, The Augustan Empire, 43 B.C.–A.D. 69 (1996).

Works
 Fronto and Antonine Rome (Harvard University Press, 1980)
 Final Judgments: Duty and Emotion in Roman Wills, 200 B.C.–A.D. 250 (University of California Press, 1991).
 Nero (Cambridge: Belknap Press, 2003). 
 The Cambridge Ancient History. Vol. X. (Editor, with Editor, with A.K. Bowman and A. Lintott)
 The Augustan Empire, 43 B.C. - A.D. 69 (Cambridge University Press, 1996).
 Phaedrus the Fabulous, Journal of Roman Studies 95 (2005) 97-123
 Tiberius the Wise, Historia 57 (2008) 408-425
 My Sejanus, Humanities 31 (2010) 18-21, 52-53

Honors and awards
Alexander von Humboldt Fellow, Heidelberg University, 1984-1985
Corresponding Member at German Archaeological Institute, 1991
Fowler Hamilton Visiting Research Fellow, Christ Church, Oxford, 1989-1990
NEH Fellow, 2007-2008
Resident in Classics, American Academy in Rome, 1994

References

External links
Classics Faculty biography at Princeton University
Curriculum vitae, hosted at Princeton University

Year of birth missing (living people)
Living people
American classical scholars
21st-century American historians
21st-century American male writers
Fellows of Christ Church, Oxford
Historians of ancient Rome
Classical scholars of Princeton University
American male non-fiction writers